A combe (also spelled coombe or coomb and, in place names, comb) can refer either to a steep, narrow valley, or to a small valley or large hollow on the side of a hill; in any case, it is often understood simply to mean a small valley through which a watercourse does not run. The word "combe" derives from Old English cumb, of the same meaning, and is unrelated to the English word "comb". It derives ultimately from the same Brythonic source as the Welsh cwm, which has the same meaning. Today, the word is used mostly in reference to the combes of southern
and southwestern England.

Examples
The following is a list places in the British Isles named for having combes:

References

Valleys
Slope landforms